The enzyme ornithine cyclodeaminase (EC 4.3.1.12) catalyzes the chemical reaction

L-ornithine  L-proline + NH4+

This enzyme belongs to the family of lyases, specifically ammonia lyases, which cleave carbon-nitrogen bonds.  The systematic name of this enzyme class is Lornithine ammonia-lyase (cyclizing; L-proline-forming). Other names in common use include ornithine cyclase, ornithine cyclase (deaminating), and L-ornithine ammonia-lyase (cyclizing).  This enzyme participates in arginine and proline biosynthesis.  It employs one cofactor, NAD+.

Structural studies

References

 
 
 
 
 

EC 4.3.1
NADH-dependent enzymes
Enzymes of known structure